Bisimbre is a municipality located in the province of Zaragoza, Aragon, Spain.

References 

Municipalities in the Province of Zaragoza